Choy Lee Fut is a Chinese martial art and wushu style,  founded in 1836 by Chan Heung (陳享). Choy Li Fut was named to honor the Buddhist monk Choy Fook (蔡褔, Cai Fu) who taught him Choy Gar, and Li Yau-San (李友山) who taught him Li Gar, plus his uncle Chan Yuen-Wu (陳遠護), who taught him Hung Kuen, and developed to honor the Buddha and the Shaolin roots of the system.

The system combines the martial arts techniques from various Northern and Southern Chinese kung-fu systems; the powerful arm and hand techniques from the Shaolin animal forms from the South, combined with the extended, circular movements, twisting body, and agile footwork that characterizes Northern China's martial arts. It is considered an external style, combining soft and hard techniques, as well as incorporating a wide range of weapons as part of its curriculum. It contains a wide variety of techniques, including long and short range punches, kicks, sweeps and take downs, pressure point attacks, joint locks, and grappling. According to Bruce Lee:

Founding 

Chan Heung (陳享), also known as Din Ying (典英), Daht Ting (逹庭), Chen Xiang Gong, and Chen Xiang (both in Mandarin), was born on August 23, 1806, or July 10, 1806 of the lunar calendar, in King Mui 京梅 (Ging Mui), a village in the San Woi 新會 (Xin Hui) district of Jiangmen, Guangdong province of China.

Chan Heung's uncle Chan Yuen-Wu (陳遠護), a boxer from the Qingyun temple near Dinghu Mountain who had trained under Du Zhang Monk (独杖禅师), who began teaching him the Fut Gar (佛家) style of Chinese martial arts when he was seven years old. When Chan Heung was fifteen, Chan Yuen-Wu took him to Li Yau-San (李友山), Chan Yuen-Wu's senior classmate. Li Yau-San had trained under Zhi Shan Monk (至善禅师).

Under Li Yau-San's instruction, Chan Heung spent the next four years learning the Li Gar style. Impressed with Chan Heung's martial arts abilities, Li Yau-San suggested that he train with a Shaolin monk called Choy Fook (Cài Fú, 蔡褔) to learn Choy Gar, a Southern Shaolin style of wushu 武术, as well as Chinese medicine and other Shaolin techniques.

According to legend, the monk Jee Sin Sim See (至善禪師) is said to have been one of the legendary Five Elders – along with Ng Mui (五梅大師), Fung Doe-Duk (馮道德), Miu Hin (苗顯) and Bak Mei (白眉道人) – who survived the destruction of the Shaolin Temple sometime during the late Qing Dynasty.

The founders of the five major family styles of Southern Chinese martial arts; Hung Gar, Choy Gar, Mok Gar, Li Gar and Lau Gar, were respectively, Hung Hei-Gun (洪熙官), Choy Gau-Yee (蔡九儀), Mok Da-Si (Mok Ching-Kiu, 莫清矯), Li Yau-San (李友山), and Lau Sam-Ngan (劉三眼); and all are said to have been students of Jee Sin Sim See. Choy Fook had learned his martial arts from Choy Gau-Yee (蔡九儀), the founder of Choy Gar.

Choy Fook had trained under five teachers, over a period of many years. His teachers were Jue Yuan Monk (觉远上人), Yi Guan Monk (一贯禅师), Li Sou (李叟), Bai Yu-Feng (白玉峰), and Cai Jiu-Yi (蔡九仪). At the time Chan Heung sought him out, he had lived as a recluse on Lau Fu mountain (羅浮山) and no longer wished to teach martial arts. Chan Heung set out to Lau Fu mountain to find him. When Choy Fook was at the Shaolin temple, he had been seriously burned, and his head had healed with scars. This gave him the nickname "Monk with the Wounded Head" (爛頭和尙). Using that description, Chan Heung eventually located the monk and handed him a letter of recommendation from Li Yau-San. However, Chan Heung was disappointed when Choy Fook turned him down. After much begging, Choy Fook agreed to take the young man as a student, but only to study Buddhism.

One morning, when Chan Heung was practicing his martial arts, Choy Fook pointed to a heavy rock and told him to kick it into the air. Instead of being complimented, he watched as Choy Fook placed his own foot under the heavy rock and effortlessly propelled it through the air. Chan Heung was awestruck by this demonstration. Again he begged Choy Fook to teach him his martial arts. This time the monk agreed, and for nine years, Choy Fook taught Chan Heung both the way of Buddhism and the way of martial arts.

When he was twenty-eight, Chan Heung left Choy Fook and returned to King Mui village in 1834, where he revised and refined all that he had learned. In 1836, Choy Fook gave Chan Heung advice in the form of a special poem known as a double couplet, as follows:
 龍虎風雲會, The dragon and tiger met as the wind and the cloud.
 徒兒好自爲, My disciple, you must take good care of your future.
 重光少林術, To revive the arts of Shaolin,
 世代毋相遺. Don't let the future generations forget about this teaching.

In 1836, Chan Heung formally established the Choy Li Fut system, named to honor his 3 teachers: that Buddhist monk, Choy Fook, who taught him Choy Gar, and Li Yau-San who taught him Li Gar, plus his uncle Chan Yuen-Woo 陳遠護, who taught him Fut Gar, and developed to honor the Buddha and the Shaolin Kung Fu roots of the system.

Characteristics 

Chan Heung 陳享 revised and refined all that he had learned from his teachers and with his disciples, established standardized hand and leg techniques.

Choy Li Fut's hand techniques contain 10 elements 十訣: Kum 擒 slapping or pressing palm deflection, Na 拿 shooting arm bridge, Gwa 掛 back fist, So 掃 sweeping, Tsop 插 yin/yang knuckle strike, Pow 拋 upward power shot, Jong 撞 small upward power shot, Chaw 爪 claw, Bin 鞭 swinging power shot, Pei 劈 chopping, and Lui Yin 擂陰 yin/yang fist.  Choy Li Fut's leg techniques contain 6 elements: Chan 撐 bracing, Ding 釘 nailing, Liu Tat 撩踢 kicking, So 掃 sweeping, Jet 截 blocking, Au 勾 hooking, and Dan 彈 springing. There are 8 techniques of how the hand and leg techniques are applied. They are: Yin 陰 negative, Yang 陽 positive, Kong 剛 hard, Yau 柔 soft, Hui 虛 false, Shi 實 real, Tou 偷 stealing, and Lau 溜 sneaking.

The stances of Choy Li Fut are similar in height to other martial arts styles, such as Hung Gar, but not as high as those of Wing Chun.  This allows the practitioner to move quickly during combat without sacrificing stability and power generation. What is unique to the Choy Li Fut style is sometimes termed "whipping", where the practitioner's upper torso twists to generate more power in executing hand and arm techniques.  In other martial art styles, the upper body is less dynamic, placing more emphasis in stability and generation of static power.  Other differences include how the practitioner's stance should be while facing their opponent. In the Hung Gar and Wing Chun styles, practitioners hold their torso perpendicular to an opponent, to allow the full use of both arms. In contrast, Choy Li Fut holds the torso at an angle to the opponent to reduce the target area exposed to him, and to allow the practitioner more reach.  Front stances in Choy Li Fut have the front bent leg angled in to protect the groin, while other martial arts systems have the front bent leg facing forward.

During revolutionary battles between anti-Qing and government forces (1850–1877), whoever belonged to the Choy Li Fut system would identify themselves by crying out "yak" when striking with the palm, "wak" when thrusting with a tiger claw hand, "ha" when striking with the fist, "hok" when using a crane beak strike, and "dik" when kicking.  These sounds are unique to the Choy Li Fut system.

Chan Heung 陳享 recorded his discoveries and knowledge onto paper for his future students to follow and eventually recorded over 250 forms and techniques.

Forms 
The Choy Li Fut system has over 150 various single person, multiple person, weapon, and training apparatus forms, e.g. the Ching jong, the Sui Sau Jong, and the Ma Jong. Since Chan Heung was a student of three highly skilled Shaolin masters, each teacher had many traditional forms. Chan Heung also developed many training and fighting forms from his own experience and years of training. There are even specialized forms for various students who had different physical shapes and abilities. These forms have been recorded into scripts which have been handed down to his closed-door students.

Initially, Ng Lun Ma 五輪馬 (Five Wheel Stance Form) and Ng Lun Chui 五輪搥 (Five Wheel Striking Form ) were created as the basic training forms that beginners must master to learn the basic foundation of stances, movement, and hand techniques.  Present day schools and branches may use different teaching and training forms as well as their own curriculum and methodologies to teach Choy Li Fut. Because of the massive number of forms in the Choy Li Fut system as a whole, it is not required to learn every form to complete training in Choy Li Fut. As the Choy Li Fut system spread, different schools and branches added other martial arts masters to their curriculum, adding new forms or modifying some form techniques.  This dissemination and evolution of Choy Li Fut resulted in the variations of forms and practices we see between schools and branches.

The Cheung Hung Sing branch of Choy Lee Fut does not practice the same forms as passed down within the lineages of Chan Heung. The Major forms taught by Cheung Hung-Sing was the In and Out (Internal and External) Bagua Kuen which contained 1080 moves in it. This form was passed down to Cheung Hung-Sing by Monk Ching Cho, and later was broken up into three forms by Chan Ngau-Sing. Those forms are Cheung Kuen, Ping Kuen, and Kau Da Kuen as passed down by Chan Ngau-Sing. Other forms of the Fut San Great Victory (Hung Sing) were Ga Ji Kuen, Che Kuen, Lin Wan Kuen, and more.  However, Cheung Hung Sing's branch was known as the fighting branch as Cheung Hung Sing was steadily training revolutionary fighters.

Weapons
Having both Northern and Southern Chinese influences gives Choy Li Fut a wide variety of weapons in its arsenal. Originally, there were 40 weapons in the system of Choy Li Fut. After many years of teaching, some past masters added different forms and other weapons into the system.

One weapon that is exclusive to Choy Li Fut is the Nine-Dragon Trident created by the founder, Chan Heung. This weapon was designed to shred any part of the opponent with which it might come into contact. The many hooks and blades can seize an opponent's weapon and, with one twist, rip it from his hands. The Nine-Dragon Trident (Gau Lung Dai Chah, 九龍大叉) is known as the "King" of all weapons.

Expansion of the system
Chan Heung 陳享 set up the first Choy Li Fut martial arts school at the local family temple of his village. As his reputation spread, hundreds of people from nearby villages came to learn Choy Li Fut. Shortly after Chan Heung established his new school, the First Opium War broke out in China. Chan Heung joined the army in Canton to fight against the British invaders. After China's defeat in 1842, he returned home to his family in King Mui.

Political corruption within the Manchu Qing dynasty had contributed to China's defeat in the war. Between 1847 and 1850 many Chinese leaders formed secret societies to overthrow the Qing. In 1850, under the leadership of Hong Xiuquan, the Taiping Rebellion broke out in Guangxi, and the movement would maintain control of large areas of southern China under the banner of the Taiping Heavenly Kingdom until its collapse in 1864.

During this era of rebellion and dissent, Chan Heung left his home in King Mui with his wife and two children, and seized the opportunity to set up many Choy Li Fut schools in Southern China to help spread revolutionary ideas against the Manchu government.

Chan Heung had 18 original Choy Li Fut disciples, known as the eighteen Luohan (十八羅漢). They were named to honor the Bodhidharma, who is traditionally considered to have taught the Shaolin monks the methods of the original Eighteen Lohan hands, in 527 CE, which some consider the predecessor of Shaolin martial arts.

In 1848, the original eighteen started branching out to teach Choy Li Fut throughout Southern China. The first disciple to teach Choy Li Fut outside of King Mui was Lung Ji-Choi 龍子才, who opened a school in the town of Xunzhou in Guangxi. Soon after, Chan Din-Foon 陳典桓 initiated the first Hung Sing (Great Saint 洪聖舘) in Foshan.

Some of the other original eighteen disciples who promoted the new kung fu system were: Chan Din-Yao 陳典尤 in Nan Hai 南海; Chan Dai-Yup 陳大揖 in Guangzhou 廣州; Chan Din-Sing 陳典承 in Zhongshan 中山; Chan Mau-Jong 陳謀莊 in Panyu 番禺; Chan Din-Bong 陳典邦 in Dong Guan 東莞; Chan Din-Wai 陳典惠 in Kaiping 開平; Chan Din-Jen 陳典珍 in Taishan 台山; Chan Sun-Dong 陳孫棟 in Enping 恩平; Chan Din-Dak 陳典德 at Heshan 鶴山; Chan Dai-Wai 陳大威 in Zhaoqing 肇慶; Chan Sing-Hin 陳承顯 in Xinhuicheng 新會城; Chan Yin-Yu 陳燕瑜at Jiangmen 江門. And admirable tasks were performed by Chan Dai-Sing 陳大成, Chan Din-Seng 陳典勝, Chan Mau-Wing 陳謀榮, and Chan Din-Gung 陳典拱, who taught Choy Li Fut in twenty-six villages in the King Mui 京梅 area.

Historically all Choy Li Fut schools ultimately have the same origins, but because of the anti-Manchu government revolutions of the mid-19th century and the ensuing chaotic political situations that existed in China, various name changes and changes in leadership created the belief that there were two completely separate Hung Sing Choy Li Fut schools.

The Hung Moon 洪門 Secret Society  represented all revolutionary factions, including all Choy Li Fut representatives. Choy Li Fut schools chose to write the name of their schools in various ways to hide their affiliation with the outlawed Hung Mun 洪門 Secret Society and to protect themselves from government persecution.

Many Choy Li Fut schools had a secret slogan during these times: "Hung 洪 Ying 英 Ji 至 Sing 聖 ; Ying 英 Hung 雄 Wing 永 Sing 勝. " This translates as: "Heroes of the Hung Party are superior; Heroes always win." Chan Heung's 陳享 followers adopted two words of the motto as their secret passwords “Hung Sing 洪勝” which meant "Hung Society Victory" but because that was too close to the outlawed Hung Mun Secret Society, so they changed the Chinese characters which sounds similar to Hung Sing 洪勝 but replaced the first character Hung 洪 to Hung 鴻 and named it Hung Sing 鴻勝, but when written in literal translation the name Hung Sing 鴻勝 means "Goose Victory".

Chan Heung 陳享 son, Koon-pak 官伯, changed the Chinese character Hung 鴻 meaning “goose” to Hung 雄 meaning "strong." From that time on, Choy Li Fut schools in Koon-pak's King Mui area designated themselves with the slogan Hung Sing 雄勝, meaning "Strong Victory," while Cheung Hung Sing's schools kept their "Goose Victory" Hung Sing 鴻勝 motto.

Foshan was a hot bed of political activities. There was a strong Manchu presence in Foshan, and battles between the Manchu government and the Hung Mun members were bloody and frequent. The Foshan Choy Li Fut School opened in 1848 under Chan Din-Foon 陳典桓 utilized the name "Hung Sing Kwoon 洪聖舘" (Meaning Great Saint Hung) to avoid associating themselves with the Hung Moon 洪門 Secret Society and to protect themselves from government persecution.

The Foshan Hung Sing 佛山鴻勝舘 branch was extremely popular and this worried the Manchu government supporters as well as created intense rivalries between martial arts schools. Rumors and gossip of the school being affiliated with the Hung Mun 洪門 Secret Society created even more tension between the Manchu controlled local government and the school. Originally, The Hung Sing Kwoon (Great Saint Hung 洪聖舘  - different to that of Cheung Hung Sing's Goose Victory Hung Sing Kwoon 鴻勝舘) started by Chan Din-Foon around 1848, the school flourished up to the time of his death.

In 1867, Chan Heung 陳享 and Jeong Yim 張炎, left Hong Kong to return to their respective cities. Chan Heung returned to King Mui to re-open his Great Saint Hung School (Hung Sing - 洪聖舘) and Cheung Hung-Sing returned to Fut San to re-open the Hung Sing Kwoon (Goose Victory 鴻勝舘) that he established in 1851. This was documented by Chan Heung, but he never said that Cheung Hung was going to be Chan Din-Foon's 陳典桓 successor. Regardless of the year, Cheung Hung-Sing took over his school and replaced the schools name of Great Saint School (Hung Sing - 洪聖舘) with his own Goose Victory (Hung Sing 鴻勝舘) name.

The Manchu government quickly sent soldiers to try to shut down the school. Because the survival of the Fut San Hung Sing Choy Li Fut school depended on training fighters quickly and efficiently, initially Jeong Yim 張炎 limited the number of forms he taught to just a handful. Enough to provide the students with all the proper techniques, including a few weapon forms. This ensured the survival of the school. Because Jeong Yim concentrated on teaching combat skills, some of the best Choy Li Fut fighters came from the Foshan Hung Sing branch. As the school became more established, Jeong Yim 張炎 would further educate his students with more advanced forms and techniques. Because of early combat training and the reputation Jeong Yim 張炎 gained for reopening the school, the Foshan Hung Sing Choy Li Fut school soon became known as the Jeong Hung Sing school of Choy Li Fut.

Main branches 
The Choy Li Fut martial arts system has spread throughout the globe, with schools on almost every continent. All are recognized as an important part of the Choy Li Fut family because they are the pioneers that helped spread the art of Choy Li Fut throughout the world.  Over time, in addition to the development of new techniques and other martial-arts styles, as with many martial arts, Choy Li Fut has developed into several lineages that may differ in training and style, and even differences in historic perspectives.  It is these developments that caused differences in forms and the application of techniques between branches and schools and contribute to the heated discussions regarding the history of Choy Li Fut.

Choy Li Fut schools can trace their lineage from the schools started by the original 18 disciples whom Chan Heung sent out in 1848. Many schools can easily trace their origins from these four main branches: the King Mui / Chan Family Choy Li Fut Branch, the Fut San / Hung Sing Choy Li Fut Branch, the Jiangmen 江門 or Kong Chow 岡州 Choy Li Fut Branch, and the Buk Sing Choy Li Fut Branch.

King Mui Choy Li Fut 京梅陳家雄勝蔡李佛拳館 

The mainline transmission is referred to as King Mui (京梅), because the founder's family came from the King Mui village, and it is where Chan Heung 陳享 officially started teaching Choy Li Fut in 1836.  Today, Chan family descendants prefer to use the term, "Chan Family" tradition, because the modern-day successor (Keeper of the Style) was Chan Yiu-Chi 陳耀墀, the son of Chan Koon-pak, and grandson of Chan Heung.

Notable none Chan family student of Chan Yi-chi was Hu Yuen-chou 胡雲綽, instructor of famous Choy Li Fut master Doc-Fai Wong 黄德輝 considered by many as a 5th generation successor and inheritor of the King Mui lineage.

After Chan Yiu-chi 陳耀墀 his son Chan Sun-chiu became the inheritor and Keeper of the style. Following the passing on April 22, 2013, of Chan Sun-chiu (Keeper of King Mui Choy Li Fut)陈燊樵, all the descendants and known students become his current successors of the 5th generation of the King Mui lineage, they are; Chan Yong-fa and Niel Willcott.

Jiangmen or Kong Chow Choy Li Fut 岡州蔡李佛 
In 1898, Chan Cheong-mo 陳長毛 founded the Sei Yup (four counties) Hung Sing School in Kong Chow 岡州 City now called Jiangmen. He learned Choy Li Fut from Chan Heung when he was a child. After Chan Heung died, he continued to study from Chan Heung's eldest son, Chan On Pak 陳安伯. He invited Chan On-pak's younger brother Chan Koon-pak to be the head instructor and assisted in teaching Choy Li Fut at the school.

Some of Chan On-Pak's other students were Yuen Jic, Mun Leung, and Mak Seih-guan.

In 1906, Chan Koon-pak went to Canton (Guangzhou) and Chan Cheong-mo 陳長毛 officially took over the school and became the head instructor of the Jiangmen Hung Sing School. Before Chan Cheong-Mo 陳長毛 died in 1953, his adopted son and successor Chew Kam-wing 赵锦荣 was appointed to be the keeper and head instructor of the Hung Sing School in Jiangmen city.

Chew Kam-wing 赵锦荣 taught in the Jiangmen Hung Sing School until the Chinese government banned traditional kung fu teaching. All of his students eventually stopped practicing and no longer taught Choy Li Fut. Chew Kam-Wing 赵锦荣 taught his sons Choy Li Fut privately; unfortunately his sons were not up to the standard that was required for passing down the traditional teaching.

Only few of the senior students of Chan Cheong-mo 陳長毛 are still alive in China. In Hong Kong, Wong Gong 黄江 is the last one.  In Jiangmen city, there are Wong Kan-Fu 黄勤富, Lui Sieh-Gen 吕社根, and the old keeper Chew Kam-wing 赵锦荣.

Wong Gong 黄江 was born in 1928, and he is a native of Jiangmen city. He studied kung fu with his father as a child and later became a disciple of Chan Cheong-mo 陳長毛. With his teacher Chan Cheong-mo's 陳長毛 permission, he continued his studies from Chan Yen, the chief instructor of King Mui Village's Hung Sing School.

Chan Yen learned Choy Li Fut from his father, Chan Yau-kau, who was a student of Chan Heung. In 1949, the communists took over mainland China. Before Wong Gong 黄江 moved to Hong Kong, both of his teachers told him to continue teaching in order to keep the Choy Li Fut system alive.

In Hong Kong, Wong Gong 黄江 is still actively involved in teaching Choy Li Fut. Chew Kam-wing 赵锦荣 now is in his mid-80s, and he and his classmates had a meeting, and all agreed that he should pass on his Keeper's position to Wong Gong 黄江. All the senior members of Chan Cheong-mo's 陳長毛 students believed Wong Gong 黄江 had achieved the greatest success in the teaching of Choy Li Fut. On February 16, 2006, Chew Kam-wing 赵锦荣 officially signed the certificate of Jeong Moon-yen to Wong Gong 黄江 as the new keeper of the Sei Yup Hung Sing Kwoon (Four Counties Hung Sing school).

The Kong Chow lineage of Choy Li Fut was created by Wong Gong in 1989. Wong Gong 黄江 named his lineage "Kong Chow 岡州" (Gangzhou) because before the Republic of China, the district of Choy Li Fut's hometown Xin Hui 新会 and Jiangmen were known as Kong Chow 岡州.

When cities in China were updated to their modern names, the old Kong Chow district became part of the city of Jiangmen. Also well known was the Hung Sing School in the Gong Moon district founded by Chan Cheong Mo, which also became part of Jiangmen.

The branch of Choy Li Fut called Kong Chow is now officially renamed the Jiangmen branch of Choy Li Fut. Wong Gong 黄江 was officially given the title "Keeper" by the former Keeper of the Hung Sing School in Jiangmen, Chew Kam-Wing, in February 2006. Now passing this to his son Mr Wong Choy in June 2017.

Wong Gong's 黄江 other teacher Chan Yen was from King Mui Village and had the Chan surname, but he was not a member of the founder's family. Because King Mui Village is now part of Jiangmen City, Chan Yen's teaching are considered to be in the Jiangmen lineage. In other words, since all of Wong Gong's 黄江 teachings are passed down are from the entire Jiangmen area, officially his lineage is now called the Jiangmen branch of Hung Sing Choy Li Fut.

The "Hung Sing" name in Fut San, China 佛山鴻勝蔡李佛拳館 

 In 1848, the 1st Fut San Great Sage Kwoon, was founded by Chan Din-foon, a student of Chan Heung.  The Great Sage Hung School "洪聖舘" = Pronounced as Hung Sing Kwoon.
 In 1851, the 1st Fut San Hung Victory School was founded by Cheung Hung-sing 張炎(張洪勝), a student of Lee Yau-san, Chan Heung, and Monk Ching Cho Wo Sheung 青草和尚. Hung Victory School "洪勝舘" =  Also pronounced as Hung Sing Kwoon.
 The difference between Chan Din Foon's  Great Sage Hung Sing 洪聖 and Cheung Hung Sing 張炎(張洪勝) Hung Victory Hung Sing "洪勝" is although they are both pronounced as Hung Sing, is that Chan Din Foon's Great Sage Hung Sing is in reference to an individual as in 'The Great Sage Hung Wu' and Cheung Hung-sing 張炎(張洪勝) Hung Victory Hung Sing "洪勝舘" is in direct reference to the primary goal of the Hung Mun/Tian Di Hui secret Society. The slogan of their goal was as follows: "The Hung" (洪) will be "Victorious (勝)" in overthrowing the Qing Empire to restore the Ming back to power".  Their goal was finally accomplished in 1911 with the fall of the Qing Dynasty in the Xinhai Revolution.
 In 1867, upon Cheung Hung Sing's return to Fut San, Cheung Hung-sing changed the name of his original Hung Victory school to avoid being captured by the corrupt Qing Empire. So, he replaced the first word of Hung "洪" (meaning The Great Sage Hung) to another Hung "鴻" meaning (Goose/Swan).  Therefore, the new name of Cheung Hung-Sing's school would be the Fut San Hung Sing Gun (佛山鴻勝舘).

Instead of giving his school a completely new name, Cheung Hung-sing 張炎(張洪勝) changed the first word, but kept the Victory (勝) in his name because it was a word highly used by the Hung Mun Secret Society and Tian Di Hui (Heaven and Earth Society).  In the mountains of Guangxie, there were 100 secret society tongs with more than 60 of them using the word Victory (勝)in their names.

The Fut San Hung Sing branch 佛山洪勝舘/佛山鴻勝舘 has some differences in the Choy Li Fut蔡李佛  under Chan Heung Great Sage (洪聖舘) curriculum. In fact, they do not share the same forms at all.  The reason for this is Chan Heung and Cheung Hung-sing separately developed the Choy Lee Fut system.  Chan Heung had was he started in King Mui and Cheung Hung-sing's system consisted of Lee Gar, Choy Lee Fut, and Fut Gar Kuen that he learned from the Monk Ching Cho (Green Grass). The Fut San Hung Sing branch has fewer hand sets; eight as their primary core. The Fut San Hung-sing branch is known for its aggressive fighting methods, such as continuous non-stop combination and exaggerated side-stance techniques, as well as some aggressive weapons forms. This curriculum was designed so anti-Qing rebels could quickly gain practical proficiency in unarmed and weapons combat.

The primary sets taught at the Fut San Hung Sing Kwoon/Great Victory School started with five forms. One form the Monk Ching Cho passed down to Cheung Hung-sing was called the In and Out Bagua Kuen, which contained 1080 moves. Cheung Hung-sing taught this to Chan Ngau-sing who later broke the set up into three smaller forms. The first was Cheung Kuen. The second is Ping Kuen (not the same as Chan Heung's Ping Kuen), and Kau Da Kuen (not the same as Chan Heung). For logThe 8 forms came later and some were lost to time. Some of them are carried in Hong Kong's Chui Kwong Yuen lineage of Fut San Hung Sing Choy Lee Fut 佛山鴻勝蔡李佛拳 and some were preserved on the lineage of Northern Shaolin Master Chan Kwok-Wai 陳國偉.  Those rare eight forms are: Tai Ji Kuen (Great Fist), Ping Ji Kuen (Level Fist), Tin Ji Kuen (Heaven's Fist), Gok Ji Kuen (Nation's Fist), Sup Ji Kuen (Cross Pattern Fist), Cheung Kuen (Long fist), Lin Waan Kaau Da Kuen (Continuous Fighting Fist), and Fut Ga Jeung (Buddha's Palm). In addition to the eight, an apparatus training form called Chi Kuen (Pulling Fist) is taught. The wooden dummy (Ching Jong) apparatus of the Fut San Hung Sing branch is referred to as the "Side Body Balance Dummy" designed to mimic the Fut San Hung Sing style side body opening salutation. They have a variety of unique weapon and hand sparring forms to teach the practical use of the system.

Some of Jeong Yim's 張炎 students include Chan Ngau-sing, Wong Say 黄四, Yuen Hai 阮系, Tarm Narp (Nap), Lui Charn (Chaun) 雷粲, and Lay Yun.

Lay Yun was a student of Cheung Yim 張炎 . Choy Yat-kew was a student of Lay Yun. Kwan Man-keng was a student of Choy Yut-kiu. Kwan Man-keng formed the Hung Sheng (Sing) Chinese Koontow and Lion Dance Society in Singapore in 1965. Chia Yim-soon 谢炎顺 is the disciple of Kwan Man-keng and succeeded him as the 掌门人 Hung Sheng (Sing) Chinese Koontow and Lion Dance Society in Singapore.

Fong Yuk-shiu was a student of Lay Yun, disciple of Cheung Hung-sing.  Some of Fong Yuk-shu's students were Chan Hon-hung and Lum Siu-larp.

Some of Chan Yiu-Chi 陳耀墀 (Chan Heung's grandson) students were Woo Van-cheuk (Hu Yuen-chou), Kong Yeung, and Li Iu-ling were some of Chan Yiu-chi's students.

Li Iu-ling established a Choy Li Fut school in Sydney, Australia 1975. In 1977 Li Iu-ling returned to Hong Kong, where he received the news that Chan Yiu-chi's 陳耀墀 grandson, Chen Yong-fa, was hoping to leave China. Li Iu-ling helped Chen Yong-fa to migrate to Australia in 1983, then handed his school over to him. Li Iu-ling later returned to Australia in 1986.

Yuen Hai 阮系 was a student of Cheung Yim 張炎. Yuen Hai 阮系 was the teacher of Lau Bun 劉彬. Lau Bun 劉彬  established the Wah-Keung Kung Fu club of Choy Lee Fut which later became the first Hung Sing Choy Lee Fut school in America in 1935.

Professor Lau Bun's students:

Jew Leong 周亮, Chan Bing-tong 陳炳棠,  E.Y. Lee 李日華 and Doc-Fai Wong 黄德輝 were all students of Lau Bun 劉彬.

Jew Leong 周亮 students:"

Dino Jew Salvatera was a student of Chan Bing-tong 陳炳棠, Jew Leong 周亮, and Ho Cherk-wa 何焯華. He is the current successor of the Hung Sing Kwoon in America.

Chan Ngau Sing's students:

Gan Yu-ten 顏耀庭,Qian Wai-Fong 錢維方, Tong Sek 湯錫 and Hu Yuen-Chou 胡雲綽.

Ho Cheurng 何祥 was a student of Qian Wai-Fong 錢維方 and Tong Sek 湯錫.

Ho Cherk-wa 何焯華 is the son of Ho Cheurng and student of Ho-Yee 何儀.

Yan You-so 甄炎初 was a student of Gan Yu-Ten'

Yan You-chin 甄耀超 was a student of Yan You-So'

Chan Kowk-wai 陳國偉 was a student of Yan You-Chin'

Roberto Baptista (AKA Beto) is a student of Chan Kowk-wai 陳國偉. He is the current successor of his lineage in the USA.

Hand forms taught in Chan Kowk Wai lineage:

1.霸王拳 Ba Wòhng Kyùhn / Bàwáng quán
2.平拳 Pìhng Kyùhn / Píng quán 
3.十字拳 Sahp Jih Kyùhn / Shízìquán
4.梅花拳 Mùih Fā Kyùhn / Méihuāquán
5.十字扣打) Sahp Jih Kau Dā Kyùhn / Sap Chi Kau Ta Kuin 
6.車輪扣打拳 Chē Lèuhn Kau Dā Kyùhn / Chēlún Kòudǎquán
7.佛掌拳Fāt Jéung Kyùhn / Fózhǎngquán 
8.金豹平肘拳 Gām Paau Pìhng Jáu Kyùhn or Pen Cha Kyùhn / Jīnbào Píngzhǒu quán
9.猛虎形拳 Máahng Fū Yìhng Kyùhn / Měnghǔxíng quán 
10.單臂蘢形拳 Dāan Bei Lùhng Yìhng Kyùhn / Dānbì Lóngxíng quán 
11.醉金剛拳 Jeui Gām Gōng Kyùhn / Zuì Jīngāngquán

 Buk Sing Choy Li Fut 
The history of the Buk Sing 北勝 branch of Choy Li Fut 蔡李佛 can be traced back to Jeong Yim 張炎 in Fut San. Jeong Yim's primary students were Chan Ngau-sing, Yuan Hai, Tam Lup, Lee Yan and Lui Charn (Chaun) 雷粲. Lui Charn had a student named Tam Sam 譚三 (Tarm Sarm).

Tam Sam was originally a Hung Gar master and wanted to further his martial arts skill by learning Choy Li Fut. He became a student of Lui Charn. Due to an unfortunate incident between Tam Sam and other students, Lui Charn expelled Tam Sam from the Choy Li Fut school before he completed his training. Thus in the Buk Sing lineage, there are only 3 primary core Choy Li Fut hand forms: Sup Jee Kuen 十字拳, Ping Kuen 平拳, Kau Da 扣打, a staff form: Seung Gaap Daan Gwun 雙夾單棍, and in later years, an original Buk Sing Choy Li Fut form, which he created. After his expulsion, Tam Sam asked some of Lui Charn's student to help him open a new Choy Li Fut branch in Guangzhou, Siu Buk 小北 (Little North) district and called it Siu Buk Hung Sing Choy Li Fut. Eventually it was shortened to Buk Sing Choy Li Fut. Tam Sam's students referred to themselves as the Buk Sing branch of Choy Li Fut. A Northern Shaolin master named Gu Ruzhang (Ku Yu-cheung|Ku Yu-jeung) befriended and joined Tam Sam and thus added more techniques to the Buk Sing Choy Li Fut curriculum.

What makes Buk Sing Choy Li Fut a unique branch is that it concentrates on the application of Choy Li Fut techniques rather than the practice of forms. Because the emphasis is on combat applications, the Buk Sing style in the tradition of the Jeong Yim (Jeong Hung-sing) has produced many excellent Choy Li Fut fighters.

From the Buk Sing Choy Li Fut branch - Tam Fei-pang, Lun Ji, Chan Nien-pak, Kong On, Kong Heng, Lee Chow, Mah Yan, Lau Kuru-tong, Lung Tse-cheung, Chang Choy, and Nip Chi-fei, were all students of Tam Sam. Nip Chi-fei established a Bak Sing Choy Li Fut school in Ipoh, Malaysia, and Chang Choy established a Buk Sing Choy Li Fut school in Kuala Lumpur, Malaysia. Kong On also learned from Chow Loong, the founder of Chow Gar, and Ku Yu-jeung (Gu Ruzhang). Kong Hing learned from his father Kong On. Li Hung was a student of Lai Chou and Lung Tse-cheung. The Lacey brothers, David and Vince Lacey were students of Kong Hing who established the first Buck Sing Choy Lay Fut in Perth 1966. David Lacey also opened a Buck Sing School in Melbourne in 1989.

 Other lineages 
Chan Koon-pak had many other students besides his son, Chan Yiu-chi. There are only a few students of his, Ngan Yiu-ting 颜耀庭, Fong Yuk-shu 方玉书, Wong Fook-wing 黄福荣 and Leong Gwei 梁贵, whose teaching legacy is still around today.

Though their initial training in Choy Li Fut was in the Fut San kwoon, Wong Fook-wing 黄福荣 and Leong Gwei 梁贵 were later students of Chan Koon-pak. Poon Dik 潘狄 studied under Wong Fook-wing 黄福荣 and Leong Gwei 梁贵. Poon Sing 潘城 was Poon Dik's son and studied directly under him. Lee Koon-hung 李冠雄 studied under Poon Sing, as well as Yun Yim-cho, Chow Bing, Leung Sai, and So Kam-fook. Tai Lam was a student of Chow Bing and Lee Koon-hung. Mak Hin-fai, Tat-mau Wong, John Wai, Li Siu-ming and Li Siu-hung (brother of Lee Koon-hung), were all students of Lee Koon-hung 李冠雄. After Lee Koon-hung's passing, Tat-mau Wong became godson of Poon Sing learning directly from him.

 Jeong Yim 

Few authenticated facts are known about Jeong Yim (張炎), but his legacy and influence on the development of Choy Li Fut can still be felt today. Jeong Yim's actual birth and death dates are not confirmed, but it is rumored that he lived between 33 and 69 years of age.  Like all great martial artists, the myths, stories, and legends which surround them are often mistaken and confused as facts. Jeong Yim's 張炎 successor Chan Ngau-sing 陳吽盛, stated that the author Nim Fut San-yen created a popular fictional story (Wǔxiá) written during the period to increase the awareness of Choy Li Fut and revolutionary activities. This story was called, "Fut San Hung Sing Kwoon".  Chan Ngau-sing 陳吽盛 knew the author, pen name Nim Fut San Yen'', personally. Such stories have no basis in historical fact. Popular Wǔxiá novels, like Wan Nian Qing and the mythology of anti-Qing organizations such as the Heaven and Earth Society, were spreading wildly through China since the early 19th century.

All of this is not officially documented. No written historic records can be found about Jeong Yim. According to the Chan Family History Book (the "Big Book"), the only historically documented fact showing a relationship between Chan Heung 陳享 and Jeong Yim 張炎 is the date of 1867, when Jeong Yim was sent to reopen the Fut San school as the successor to Chan Din-foon 陳典桓.

The heated controversy surrounding Jeong Yim is in regards with the history and development of Choy Li Fut. Various Choy Li Fut branches have differing versions of how Choy Li Fut was founded and/or created.
The various versions of history regarding Jeong Yim, and his influence on the development of Choy Li Fut, can be found in the text about Jeong Yim.

Death of the founder 
When the Tai Ping Tian Guo (太平天國) government fell in 1864, Chan Heung 陳享 left China for a few years, some speculate South East Asian locations such as Hong Kong, Malaysia, or Singapore. At age fifty-nine, he became the martial arts teacher for the Chan Family Association overseas. In 1867, Chan Heung 陳享 returned home to King Mui, where he was able to see his own kung fu system gain tremendous popularity throughout Southern China. On the lunar calendar 8th moon 20, in 1875, at the age of sixty-nine, Chan Heung 陳享 died. He was buried in the village of King Mui.

After Chan Heung's 陳享 death, his Choy Li Fut 蔡李佛 legacy passed on to his two sons, Chan On-pak 陳安伯 and Chan Koon-pak 陳官伯. Chan On-pak 陳安伯 the oldest brother, was born in 1839. His specialty was the spear. Chan On-pak's 陳安伯 control of the spear was so advanced that he gained the nickname "Yut Cheung Ng Mui Fa" 一槍五梅花 or "Five Blossoms with One Lance."

In 1894, two of Chan On-pak's 陳安伯 students, Cheng Si-leung 鄭士良 and Chan Siu-bak 陳少白, helped the Tongmenghui 中國同盟會, the revolutionary forces of Sun Yat-sen 孫逸仙 to fight against the Qing government and lay the foundation of the Republic of China (Taiwan ROC). The younger son, Chan Koon-pak 陳官伯, left King Mui to become a merchant in Kong Moon 江門市 (Jiangmen) City, where his fame as a martial artist spread quickly. He soon had no time to spend as a merchant and devoted all of his efforts teaching Choy Li Fut. In later years, Chan Koon-pak 陳官伯 established another large Choy Li Fut training center in Guangzhou 廣州.

Notes

References

Bibliography
 

Chinese martial arts
Guangdong Nanquan
Buddhist martial arts